Andréeneset is headland at the southwestern point of the island of Kvitøya in the Svalbard archipelago. It is named after engineer and Arctic explorer Salomon August Andrée.

See also
Hornodden

References

Headlands of Svalbard
Kvitøya